The 1967 Campeonato Profesional was the 20th season of Colombia's top-flight football league. 14 teams competed against one another. Deportivo Cali won their second league title.

Teams

Standings

Source: RSSSF.com Colombia 1967

References

External links 
Dimayor official website

1967 in Colombian football
Colombia
Categoría Primera A seasons